The  is a diplomatic mission of Japan. It is located in the Buckhead area of Atlanta. The consulate's jurisdiction includes Georgia, Alabama, North Carolina, and South Carolina.

History
The consulate was established on February 15, 1974. At the time, 20 Japanese companies had operations in the Southeastern United States. In 1995 Yuji Miyamoto, the consul general, said that economic relations between Japan and Georgia and other economic states and "grassroots relationships" between those areas were increasing. That year, 200 unionists from several states in the Southern United States protested at Colony Square, the location of the consulate at the time, in Midtown Atlanta. They went to deliver a letter of appeal to the consulate regarding the replacement of over 2,000 Bridgestone/Firestone workers who were striking. Security officers from the complex intervened.

In 2002 the consulate announced it was moving from Colony Square to One Alliance Center. The consulate had over three years left in the lease of Colony Square. Because Trizec Properties owned both office properties, the consulate was easily able to move to its new location. In 2005, there were almost 700 Japanese companies with operations in the Southeastern United States, employing over 89,500 people. The cumulative Japanese investment was over $20 billion that year. In 2005 almost 20,000 Japanese nationals resided in that region, including 6,600 in the State of Georgia.

Facility
It is located in Suite 850 of the Phipps Tower in the Buckhead area of Atlanta. Previously (as of 2005) the consulate was in Suite 1600 on the 16th floor of the One Alliance Center in Buckhead,  and the consul general's office had a northward panoramic view of the Kennesaw Mountain. In 2005 the consul general's mansion was also in Buckhead. In a prior period (as of 1995) the consulate was in Colony Square in Midtown Atlanta.

See also

 Seigakuin Atlanta International School
 Consulate-General of Japan, Detroit
 Consulate-General of Japan, Honolulu
 Consulate-General of Japan, Houston
 Consulate-General of Japan, Nashville
 Diplomatic missions of Japan

References

External links
Consulate-General of Japan, Atlanta

Atlanta
Diplomatic missions in Atlanta
Japan–United States relations
1974 establishments in Georgia (U.S. state)
Asian-American culture in Georgia (U.S. state)